Jaime Acuña Iglesias (born 5 March 1978 in Pontevedra) is a Spanish sprint canoer who competed in the early 2000s. He won three medals at the ICF Canoe Sprint World Championships with a silver (K-4 200 m: 2002) and two bronzes (K-4 200 m: 2003, K-4 500 m: 2002).

Notes

References 

 
 
 

1978 births
Living people
Spanish male canoeists
ICF Canoe Sprint World Championships medalists in kayak
Sportspeople from Pontevedra
21st-century Spanish people